Space communication may refer to:
 Communication between spacecraft
 Spacecom, an Israeli company